Qullpa (Aymara and Quechua for saltpeter, Hispanicized spelling Jollpa)  is a mountain in the Andes of Peru, about  high. It is situated in the Arequipa Region, Castilla Province, on the border of the districts Ayo and Uñón. Qullpa lies south of the mountain Yanqha.

See also 
 Yanawara

References

Mountains of Peru
Mountains of Arequipa Region